As was the custom since 1930, the 1956 Tour de France was contested by national and regional teams. Seven national teams were sent, with 10 cyclists each from France, Italy, Belgium, the Netherlands, Spain, Switzerland and Luxembourg/Mixed (the latter a combined team of seven Luxembourgian cyclists plus one Portuguese, one British and one Italian cyclist). France additionally sent five regional teams from 10 cyclists each, divided into Center-North East France, South East France, West France, Ile de France and South West France. In total, 120 cyclists started the race.

The winner of the three previous editions, Louison Bobet, was absent because he had surgery. There were less climbs than usual and no mountain top finishes, so cycling experts expected this edition to be too easy. No other former Tour de France winner started the race. This was the third time in history that the race started without former winners, after the initial 1903 Tour de France and the 1927 Tour de France. As Bobet was not there, the race was open, and so there were many riders thought able to win the Tour. The most favourite of these was probably Charly Gaul, who had won the 1956 Giro d'Italia, although he was in a weak team, and would also be aiming for the mountains classification.

Start list

By team

By rider

By nationality

References

1956 Tour de France
1956